Swank Motion Pictures, Inc. is an international, non-theatrical, film distributor and licensor. Founded in 1937, it is privately owned and operated by the Swank family. It is one of the world's largest non-theatrical distributors of motion pictures for public performance. Based in Sunset Hills, a suburb of St. Louis, Swank also maintains a sales office in Paris.

Swank represents major Hollywood and independent movie studios to distribute movies licensed for public performance to non-theatrical venues.

Studios represented 

A24 Films
CBS Films
Cohen Media
Columbia Pictures
DreamWorks Pictures
eOne Entertainment
Fine Line Features
Focus Features
Hallmark Hall of Fame
HBO
Hollywood Pictures
Image Entertainment
Lionsgate
Magnolia Pictures
MGM
Millennium Entertainment
Miramax Films
Monterey Media
National Geographic
New Line Cinema
Paramount Pictures
Relativity Media
Sony Pictures
Summit Entertainment
Touchstone Pictures
TriStar Pictures
United Artists
Universal Studios
Walt Disney Pictures
Warner Bros.
Warner Independent Pictures
The Weinstein Company
 other independent studios

Public performance licensing 

Swank Motion Pictures provides both public performance licensing rights and licensed movies to numerous non-theatrical markets.
Public performance:  any performance, display, exhibition, showing, etc. of a copyrighted piece of work that occurs outside of a home.
Non-theatrical: any venue, other than a theater, that is outside of the home.

Non-theatrical venues 

U.S. colleges and universities
Worldwide cruise lines
Parks and recreation facilities
K-12 schools
Libraries
Correctional facilities
Museums
Film societies
Restaurants
Bars
Churches, synagogues and other faith-based organizations
Businesses
Trade shows and conventions
Healthcare facilities
American military hospitals
Motor coaches
Amtrak trains
Clubs
Camps and other outdoor venues

History 

Swank Motion Pictures, Inc. was founded in 1937 by P. Ray Swank and began operations in St. Louis as a "portable projection service." This period predated such familiar entertainment standards as color film, 35mm slides, audiotape and television. The company's projection service consisted of providing short entertainment films and slides, the motion picture projector, sound system and lantern slide projector. These services, along with the equipment operators, were provided at locations where customers were conducting meetings. These local organizations, civic groups, schools and churches relied on Swank to "set up and run the show" for their entertainment. Over the years the needs for equipment and the actual movie separated, and, in turn, so did the company. The two divisions became known as Swank Motion Pictures, which provided the licensed movie content, and Swank Audio Visuals, which provided the audiovisual equipment. The audiovisual division gradually migrated to working primarily with hotels as an in-house service. Swank Audio Visuals was sold by the Swank family in the 2000s. Swank Motion Pictures, Inc. continues to distribute licensed motion pictures to non-theatrical markets both domestically and internationally.

Divisions of Swank Motion Pictures, Inc. 

 Digital Campus
 Motorcoach Movies
 Movie Licensing USA
 On-Board Movies
 Residence Life Cinema
 Swank Films Distribution France
 Swank Filmverleih, Germany
 Swank HealthCare
 Swank Motion Pictures

External links 
 
 mpaa.com: public performance law

Film distributors of the United States